Limnomys is a genus of rodent in the family Muridae endemic to Mindanao, Philippines. It contains the following species:
 Gray-bellied mountain rat (Limnomys bryophilus)
 Mindanao mountain rat (Limnomys sibuanus)

References

 
Rodent genera
Taxa named by Edgar Alexander Mearns
Taxonomy articles created by Polbot
Endemic fauna of the Philippines